Amiri-ye Pain may refer to:
 Amiri-ye Pain, Chaharmahal and Bakhtiari
 Amiri-ye Pain, Lorestan